Rostam Mirlashari (born 22 January 1961 in Zahedan, Iran) is a Balochi singer from Iran, based in Sweden. He makes songs in Balochi, Kurdish, Persian, and some other Iranian languages.

Background
Mirlashari grew up in Sistan-Baluchistan a province of Iran and was inspired by his parents Shah Soltan Shiranzaei and Hossein Mirlashari who were both singers. Mirlashari studied civil engineering, worked in the building industry and was a director of a construction company in Minab. He is fluent in Persian, Swedish and English in addition to his native Balochi. According to Pakistan Idol, Mirlashari is known for being the prince of Balochi music.

Sweden
In 1991, the political situation and fear for his life in Sistan and Baluchestan Province convinced him to leave Iran and move to Sweden. In 1994, he established a band made up of a mix of musicians from Balochistan, Sweden, Africa and a few European countries. He called the band Golbang. He is an active musician and considers himself to be a member of both the Swedish culture and the Balouch culture. Mirlashari also studied at The Royal College of Music in Stockholm.

Pakistan
He sang an old and famous balochi song Laila O Laila on Coke Studio Pakistan (Season 6) episode 4 aired on 21 December 2013. His performance received positive reviews from the public.

Discography
 Omit, 1998
 Padik, 2000
 Golbang, 2000
 Saali nó, 2003
 "Sheida" (single), 2007
 Nouruz, EP, 2008
 Setareh, 2009
 "Hela Världen" (Anders Nyberg ensemble, a compilation album on which Rostam performs), 2009
 Morid (Golbang, EP) 2012
 Padik (Padik), 2013
 Morid (Golbang), 2016
 Pour-Afrigha (Feat Saeid Shanbehzadeh), 2017

References
 www.rostammirlashari.com

External links
Rostam Mirlashari at The International Artist Database
Coke Studio Pakistan at YouTube
Coke Studio Pakistan Facebook
Coke Studio Pakistan at SoundCloud

1961 births
Living people
Baloch musicians
Baloch male singers
Iranian emigrants to Sweden
20th-century Iranian male singers
Swedish people of Baloch descent
21st-century Iranian male singers